was a village located in Nishiibaraki District, Ibaraki Prefecture, Japan.

On February 1, 2005, Nanaki, along with the town of Jōhoku, and the village of Katsura (both from Higashiibaraki District), was merged to create the town of Shirosato and no longer exists as an independent municipality.

As of 2003, the village had an estimated population of 2,385 and a density of 37.83 persons per km². The total area was 63.04 km².

External links
 Official website of Shirosato 

Dissolved municipalities of Ibaraki Prefecture